A Gathering at the Crossroads is an African American monument on the southern end of the Pennsylvania State Capitol Complex in Harrisburg, Pennsylvania. Officially dedicated in 2020 to commemorate the 100 and 150-year anniversaries of the passing of the Fifteenth Amendment and Nineteenth Amendment, the monument celebrates the power of the vote and commemorates the historic African American community in Harrisburg and the wider Commonwealth of Pennsylvania between 1850 and 1920.  

The monument cost was $360,000, with donations from the city of Harrisburg, the Foundation for Enhancing Communities (TFEC) and philanthropist Peggy Grove.

The bronze group features four life-size statues of historically-significant African American activists (Thomas Morris Chester, Jacob T. Comptom, William Howard Day, and Frances Ellen Watkins Harper), who are represented in the midst of conversation about the recent passage of the Fifteenth Amendment in 1870 that gave African American men the right to vote. These orators stand around a bronze pedestal that features a three-dimensional aerial rendering of the streets and buildings of the Old Eighth Ward, a diverse neighborhood of new immigrants and Black residents demolished in 1911-1917 to create the park that now surrounds the Pennsylvania State Capitol. The sides of the pedestal include renderings of churches, synagogues, businesses, and schools before their destruction and feature a list of names of 100 influential individuals--the 100 Voices--who resided in Harrisburg and advocated for equality, freedom, and justice for the Black community.

The monument is located near the corner of North Fourth Street and Walnut Street.

References 

Monuments and memorials in Harrisburg, Pennsylvania
2020 establishments in Pennsylvania